Leslie Scott (1895–1973) was an English footballer who played in the Football League for Preston North End, Sunderland and Stoke.

Career
Scott began playing football with his local amateur team in Fulwell before he was spotted by Sunderland in 1913. He made his debut in 1914 and established himself as the "Black Cats" number one during the 1914–15 season. He remained with Sunderland after World War I and after three more seasons with the club he left for newly promoted Stoke in 1922. He did not have the desired impact at Stoke as the team struggled in the First Division and were relegated, Scott playing 20 matches during the 1922–23 season before he was released to Preston North End. After a short spell in Preston he returned to his home town of Sunderland and worked for the Sunderland Corporation Tramways.

Career statistics

References

English footballers
Preston North End F.C. players
Sunderland A.F.C. players
Stoke City F.C. players
English Football League players
1895 births
1973 deaths
Association football goalkeepers